Mount Ommaney is a south-western riverside suburb in the City of Brisbane, Queensland, Australia. The mountain of the same name is located within the locality.

Geography 

The Centenary Highway is the eastern boundary of the suburb.

Mount Ommaney is located on the southern side of the Brisbane River (across from Pinjarra Hills) and the majority of the properties are located on the hill itself. A relatively large section of Mount Ommaney is forest that is protected by the Brisbane City Council and will not be developed, this includes the area next to the river that was once a stone quarry. The Mount Ommaney Shopping Centre is located on the outskirts of the suburb and is opposite to the Mount Ommaney Hotel.

Homes on the top of the mountain generally have views either to the Brisbane CBD, the suburbs, the countryside on the opposite side of the river or the river itself. These houses tend to be very expensive as spare residential land is rare in Mount Ommaney.

McLeod Country Golf Club is in the west of the suburb and has a golf course of 18 holes. Alfresco dining on the verandah is available over looking the course and across to the hill and creek.

History
The suburb takes its name from the mountain, which in turn takes its name from John Mansell Ommaney, the nephew of Stephen Simpson, Commissioner for Crown Lands in the Moreton Bay District. Simpson had designated his nephew, John Ommaney as his heir. On 11 March 1856 the young man, aged 20, was riding from Wolston House and was thrown from his horse. The horse returned to Wolston House and a search was undertaken. Ommaney was found on the ground insensible and, despite medical attention, died. His body was taken by steamer to be buried in the Church of England cemetery at Paddington.

The western part of the original land holdings that became the Centenary Suburbs were part of the Wolston Estate, consisting of 54 farms on an area of 3000 acres, offered for auction at Centennial Hall, Brisbane, on 16 October 1901. Wolston Estate is the property of M. B. Goggs, whose father obtained the land forty years previously in the 1860s and after whom Goggs Road is named. Only three of the farms sold at the original auction.

In 1879, the local government area of Yeerongpilly Division was created. In 1891, parts of Yeerongpilly Division were excised to create Sherwood Division becoming a Shire in 1903 which contained the area of Wolston Estate. In 1925, the Shire of Sherwood was amalgamated into the City of Brisbane.

Mount Ommaney was developed as part of the Hooker Centenary Project in 1959. It and the surrounding suburbs such as Jindalee are known as the Centenary Suburbs (1959 being the Centenary of Queensland).

Mount Ommaney Special School opened on 1 January 1992.

Mount Ommaney Library opened in 1997 with a major refurbishment in 2015.

The median age of the Mount Ommaney population was 45 years of age, 8 years above the Australian median. 58% of people living in Mount Ommaney were born in Australia, compared to the national average of 69.8%; the next most common countries of birth were England 4.5%, Vietnam 3.4%, Taiwan 3.3%, New Zealand 2.9%, South Africa 2.8%. 68.7% of people spoke only English at home; the next most common languages were 6.4% Mandarin, 4.9% Vietnamese, 4.6% Cantonese, 1.8% Arabic, 1.4% Tamil.

Education 
Mount Ommaney Special School is a special primary and secondary (Early Childhood-12) school for boys and girls at 94 Capitol Drive. In 2017, the school had an enrolment of 87 students with 35 teachers (28 full-time equivalent) and 55 non-teaching staff (35 full-time equivalent).

There are no regular schools in Mount Ommaney. The nearest primary schools are Jindalee State School to the north in neighbouring Jindalee and Jamboree Heights State School to the south in neighbouring Jamboree Heights. The nearest secondary school is Centenary State High School in Jindalee.

Amenities 
The Brisbane City Council operates a public library in the Mount Ommaney Centre at 171 Dandenong Road. The Centenary sub-branch of the Queensland Country Women's Association meets at the Mount Ommaney Library.

Transport

Mount Ommaney Shopping Centre bus station serves routes to Brisbane City, surrounding Centenary Suburbs and Heathwood.

Brisbane Transport operates 13 routes that serve stops in Mount Ommaney:

* Services are one way during each peak with the AM services towards the city and PM peak from the city.

References

External links

 
 

Suburbs of the City of Brisbane